USS Active, a schooner built in Baltimore as Clara, was purchased by the Navy in September 1837 for use in the Wilkes Exploring Expedition, but she was found to be unsuitable for that mission. Under the command of Lt. William G. Woolsey, she made a brief cruise along the eastern seaboard serving as a relief ship for merchantmen in distress. She was sold during the summer, some sources suggest July 1838.

Notes
Citations

Bibliography 

Online sources
 

Ships built in Baltimore
Schooners of the United States Navy
1837 ships